The following lists events that happened during 1986 in Singapore.

Incumbents
President: Wee Kim Wee
Prime Minister: Lee Kuan Yew

Events

January
January – The Ministry of Education introduces a Single Session System for schools.
18 January – NETS was officially launched in Singapore, allowing people to pay electronically instead of using cash.

March
15 March – Hotel New World collapses, killing 33 people and leaving 17 injured.

June
 17 June – The National University Hospital is officially opened.

July
8 July – The first MRT train is delivered to Bishan Depot.

September
1 September – The first Town Councils are established.

October
3 October – Raffles City, a mixed-use development, is officially opened. During the opening, several proposals to revamp tourism attractions are announced, including upgrading Haw Par Villa, enhancing historic areas like Chinatown and Bugis, a heritage link in the city, revamp of Sentosa and Fort Canning Park, and hosting more sports and cultural events.

November
13 November – Wisma Atria opens to the public.
18–20 November – Chaim Herzog visits Singapore.
30 November – The first episode of Crimewatch is shown on SBC 5.

Births
 5 May – Dawn Yeoh, actress.
 5 August – Oon Shu An, actress and host.
 19 August – Desmond Tan, actor.
 26 September – Rebecca Lim, actress.
 17 October – Nicole Seah, politician.

Deaths
 15 October – Alex Josey, journalist and writer (b. 1910).
 14 December – Teh Cheang Wan, former Minister for National Development (b. 1928).

References

 
Singapore
Years in Singapore
Singapore